Johannes Lambertus (Bertus) de Harder  (14 January 1920 – 7 December 1982) was a Dutch footballer who played as a striker. He scored 3 goals in 11 games for the Netherlands national team. He represented the Netherlands at the 1938 FIFA World Cup.

He played for FC Girondins de Bordeaux in France where he later became a manager with AS Angoulême and FC Mulhouse.

References

 
 
 
 Biography

1920 births
1982 deaths
Association football forwards
Dutch footballers
Netherlands international footballers
Dutch expatriate footballers
Expatriate footballers in France
Dutch expatriate sportspeople in France
FC Girondins de Bordeaux players
Ligue 1 players
Ligue 2 players
ADO Den Haag players
Angoulême Charente FC players
1938 FIFA World Cup players
Dutch football managers
Angoulême Charente FC managers
FC Mulhouse managers
Footballers from The Hague
SVV Scheveningen players